O Rio, A Cidade, A Árvore (English: The River, The City, The Tree) is the second album from the Brazilian rock band Fresno, released in 2004, through the RCT and Antídoto.

The album was also released only with the standard version. The album received favorable reviews and  produced one single.

Background and concept
In 2004, the second CD is written: "O Rio, A Cidade, A Árvore" which refers to meanings of the word Fresno. This CD has consolidated the band's indie scene and the national song "Onde Está" was a huge success, it made the charts and emerged to Fresno for the general public.

Cover
The cover is composed of leaves and trees.

Music
This album of Fresno, contrary to what one might think, no party in the heart of the beholder. Even though the letters are full of anguish ... It is more or less this line of reasoning. There is heat in the darkness.
After a debut set the expectations for this release won a mega size, tempered by the release of the single virtual "Onde Está" here that is also present as one of the highlights. In truth, it is difficult to clamp individual standouts, as we have a sound example of consistency, especially in the lyrics, making the work almost conceptual.

But remember the presence of new elements such as guitars and keyboards on some tracks, especially the beautiful and revealing "Verdades Que Tanto Guardei". The competence of the musicians is already proven, no need to rip silk, but it is remarkable the maturing of the vocal work of Paraíba, sooner the better guitarist than singer, now good with both.

There are 12 themes that deal with what any good fan of Fresno expect: Love afflictions that, on the one hand make you teary-eyed, also renewed hope. Of course there is something more important than love in life, but not better. And Paraíba, which makes all the letters, should know well.

Release and promotion

Tour

Fresno began to support his album on 11 February 2005 in São Paulo and ended on 29 December 2005 in Rio Grande do Sul.

Singles
"Onde Está" not been released to radio but told Brazilian with a music video for the song.

Track listing

References

2004 albums
Fresno (band) albums